Tourtrol is a commune in the Ariège department located in southwestern France.

Population
Inhabitants of Tourtrol are called Tourtroléens.

See also
Communes of the Ariège department

References

Communes of Ariège (department)
Ariège communes articles needing translation from French Wikipedia